Nisi Dominus is a setting of the Latin text of Psalm 127 (Vulgate 126) by George Friederic Handel.  The name of the piece comes from the first two words (the incipit) of the psalm, and it is catalogued in the composer's complete works as HWV 238.  It was completed by 13 July 1707, and is one of a number of works he composed in Italy. It is most likely that Nisi Dominus was first performed on 16 July 1707 in the church of Santa Maria in Montesanto, Rome, under the patronage of the Colonna family.

In the concluding doxology, Handel writes for eight voices in a double chorus and (uniquely in his output) a double string orchestra.

A typical performance lasts almost 12 minutes.

Movements 

The work has the following movements:

See also
 List of Latin church music by George Frideric Handel

External links
Psalm 127 at ChoralWiki

Compositions by George Frideric Handel
Psalm settings
1707 compositions